This is a list of Bulgarian football transfers for the 2014–15 winter transfer window. Only transfers involving a team from the A group and B group are listed.

A PFG

Beroe

In:

Out:

Botev Plovdiv

In:

Out:

Cherno More

In:

Out:

CSKA Sofia

In:
 

Out:

Haskovo

In:
 

Out:

Levski Sofia

In:

Out:

Litex Lovech

In:

Out:

Lokomotiv Plovdiv

In:

Out:

Lokomotiv Sofia

In:
 

Out:

Ludogorets Razgrad

In:

Out:

Marek Dupnitsa

In:

Out:

Slavia Sofia

In:

Out:

B PFG

Bansko

In:

Out:

Botev Galabovo

In:

Out:

Botev Vratsa

In:

Out:

Burgas

In:

Out:

Chernomorets Burgas

In:

Out:

Dobrudzha

In:

Out:

Lokomotiv Gorna Oryahovitsa

In:

Out:

Lokomotiv Mezdra

In:

Out:

Montana

In:

Out:

Pirin Blagoevgrad

In:

Out:

Pirin Razlog

In:

Out:

Rakovski 2011

In:

Out:

Septemvri Simitli

In:

Out:

Sozopol

In:

Out:

Spartak Varna

In:

Out:

Vereya

In:

Out:

References

Bulgaria
Winter 2014-15